Knapthorpe is a hamlet in the Newark and Sherwood district of eastern Nottinghamshire, England. It is within the civil parish of Caunton.

Toponymy 
Knapthorpe was Chenapetorp or Chenatorp in the Domesday Book of 1086. The first portion is Old English cnapa, meaning 'boy,' and possibly used as a personal name, with torp/thorpthorpe being Scandinavian in origin for small place, so "The hamlet of Knapp, or Knappi". It also could be based on the Middle English noun cnap(p), for "top, mountain top", with the surrounding land being part of a local shallow peak.

Geography 
Knapthorpe is surrounded by the following local areas:

 Caunton to the north
 Hockerton and Upton to the south
 Bathley and Little Carlton to the east
 Winkburn to the west.

This area lies to the south west of the parish, and its core is located where Caunton Road, sited between Hockerton and Caunton villages. It is predominantly a farming community, interspersed with some minor industry, and is surrounded by farms, the occasional residential dwelling and greenfield land.

There are four sites within the heart of the hamlet:

 Knapthorpe Grange, a farm
 Knapthorpe Lodge, hosting a home decor business
 Knapthorpe Manor
 Little Manor Farm

There are two small tributaries which rise in the area and flow into the Beck at Caunton.

There is a private landing strip, Caunton Airfield with grass runways for microlight aircraft, east of the location.

Governance 
Knapthorpe along with Caunton village form Caunton parish.

The parish contained 483 residents at the 2011 census.

It is managed at the first level of public administration by Caunton Parish Council.

At district level, the wider area is managed by Newark and Sherwood District Council.

Nottinghamshire County Council provides the highest level strategic services locally.

History 
Knapthorpe was before the conquest held along with other land by Thori, son of Roal..It was reported upon in the Domesday survey of 1086, then containing four manors. The area was associated with a number of other nearby places suffixed thorpe, namely Beesthorpe and Middlethorpe, these having in common arable soils. The principal manor in the 11th century was held by Walter de Aincourt, who was a large Nottinghamshire land owner. Later owners were descendants of the Deycourt family, the Nevilles, as well as members of the Bussy, Sutton, and Thorold families, alongside the Duke of Rutland.

Economy 
While much of the area surrounding the residential settlement is agricultural with nearby farms working the land, there are also medium-sized retail premises offering household furnishings and pet supplies processing.

References 

Hamlets in Nottinghamshire
Newark and Sherwood